Sampang Regency is a regency of East Java province, Indonesia. It is situated on Madura Island, bordering on Pamekasan Regency to the east, the Java Sea to the north, Bangkalan Regency to the west and Madura Strait to the south. It covers an area of 1,233.3 km2, and had a population at the 2010 census of 877,772 and at the 2020 census of 969,694. The administrative centre is the port of Sampang, on the south coast of Madura.

Administrative Districts 
Sampang Regency consists of fourteen districts, tabulated below with their areas and their populations at the 2010 census and the 2020 census. The table also includes the location of the district administrative centres, the number of administrative villages (rural desa and urban kelurahan) in each district, and its post code.

Note: (a) Sampang District includes the small island of Pulau Mandangin, off the south coast of Madura.

References

External links 

Regencies of East Java
Madura Island